The Federal Ministry of the Treasury was a ministry of the Federal Republic of Germany charged with overseeing the economic possessions of the Federal government.

It was founded in 1957 as the Federal Ministry of Federal Patrimony to replace the earlier Ministry for Economic Cooperation

In 1961, under the auspices of minister Hans Lenz, it was renamed Federal Ministry for the Treasury.

In 1969, the ministry was dissolved and its functions transferred to the ministries of Finance and Economics.

List of Ministers

Political Party:

Treasury
Ministries established in 1957
1957 establishments in West Germany